is a Japanese professional race car driver. In professional racing, he is a two-time 24 Hours of Le Mans class winner and the 2001 All Japan GT Championship runner-up. He is also known for touge driving.

The car he drives, a Toyota AE86 Sprinter Trueno, has become one of the most popular sports cars; the car is also known as "Hachi-Roku" in Japan (hachi-roku meaning "eight six"); his car is also called "The Little Hachi that could." A 2-part video known as 'The Touge' produced by Pluspy documents Tsuchiya's touge driving with his AE86.

He was a consultant for the popular manga and anime series, Initial D, of which the main character Takumi Fujiwara is a character which describes him. He also served as a stunt coordinator and stuntman on The Fast and the Furious: Tokyo Drift, where he also made a cameo appearance.

Biography
Tsuchiya started his career through the Fuji Freshman series in 1977. Unlike many drivers who came from wealthy families or motorsport backgrounds, he honed his skills from street racing and became noted in the underground scene.

Racing career
 National championships

He would continue to take part in the Japanese Formula Three Championship, Japanese Touring Car Championship (JTCC), the latter while driving a Cosmo Oil Sierra Cosworth and Nissan Skyline GT-R (Team Taisan) in the Group A championships and later a Honda Civic in the Supertouring car championships.

 Le Mans
He went on to score a class win and an 8th place overall at the 1995 24 Hours of Le Mans in a Honda NSX. In 1999 of the same race, this time in a Toyota GT-One, during the last hour while co-driver Ukyo Katayama was building up pace to the leading BMW V12 LMR he was forced into the grass by a backmarker privateer's BMW LMP, blowing the tire out. They survived the ordeal and went on to score the fastest lap but were forced to settle for second.

 NASCAR
He has raced in NASCAR-sanctioned exhibition races at Suzuka Circuit (Suzuka Thunder 100) and at Twin Ring Motegi Superspeedway for the 1998 NASCAR-sanctioned exhibition and 1999 NASCAR Grand National Division, AutoZone West Series races at the circuit, both named the Coca-Cola 500K.

Drifting career
When Tsuchiya was a freshman in circuit racing, he was about to get his racing license suspended because of the illegal racing he was recording for the Drift Pluspy video. In the movie series Shuto Kousoku Trial, he advised street racers to leave the illegal racing scene if they want to become involved with professional racing.

After his retirement
After his retirement, he remained in racing and is now an official Drift Muscle judge after quitting D1 in January 2011 and was Team Director for both GT500 for one year and GT300 Class of ARTA JGTC Team until the team disbanded their GT300 operation at the end of the 2005 season. He owned the aftermarket company Kei Office until he sold the business in the end of 2005 to form DG-5. His trademark color is jade green which appears on his overalls and helmet and is the adopted color of the former company. It was also the colour of the D1 Grand Prix Kei Office and DG-5 S15 Silvia of driver and employee Yasuyuki Kazama who also wears a suit similar in pattern.

He also hosts the video magazine "Best Motoring" which features road tests of new Japanese cars including a special section called "Hot Version" which focuses on performance-modified cars. He is a guest presenter in Video Option, a monthly video magazine, similar to Hot Version except regularly covers the D1GP and its sister video magazine Drift Tengoku which deals purely with drifting.

He has been an editorial supervisor on the televised anime Initial D and Wangan Midnight. He also appeared in the semi biographical film Shuto Kousoku Trial 2, 3, 4, 5, and 6 was also featured in the Super GT magazine show in Japan. His life in driving is parallel to that of the Initial D main character, Takumi, as both of them started exploring their local touge while doing regular deliveries for their family businesses. He makes a number of cameos in the series: in the First Stage, he briefly converses with Takumi's father, Bunta; in the Third Stage, a motorcycle rider wearing a similar racing suit overtakes Takumi as he was en route to an invitation battle with Ryosuke Takahashi; and in the Final Stage, he meets Takumi in person while the latter spectates a circuit race in the end credits. The color of Tomo's racing suit from the Initial D 4th Stage is jade green and has a similar pattern to Tsuchiya's suit. He also made an appearance opposite Top Gear's Jeremy Clarkson in a Motorworld in Japan special showing drifting competition in the mid 1990s in Japan.

After 1995, he sometimes appeared as a Formula One guest commentator in Japanese Fuji TV.

In 2006, he made a cameo as a fisherman in the movie The Fast and the Furious: Tokyo Drift in which he served as a stunt coordinator and stunt man.

In 2014, he announced a joint venture with King of Europe ProSeries in order to create King of Asia ProSeries. He would also act as one of the main judges for several important races in the King of Europe Drift ProSeries, being called in as a guest representative throughout the years.

Career summary
1977: Debut in Fuji Freshman series.
1981–1984: Ran selected entries in All Japan Touring Car championship.
1984: Fuji Freshman series race (Toyota AE86) – 6 wins
1985: All Japan Touring Car championship (Toyota AE86) 1st in Class 3
1986: Corolla Sprinter Cup – 2 podium places
1987: All Japan Touring Car championship (Honda Civic) – 1 win
1988: Toyota Cup – 1st overall
All Japan Touring Car championship (BMW E30) – 3rd in Class 2
Macau Guia race (BMW M3) – 4th overall
1989: All Japan F3 championship
All Japan Touring Car championship (Ford Sierra Cosworth) – 1 win
1990: All Japan Touring Car championship (Ford Sierra Cosworth)
Macau Guia race (Ford Sierra Cosworth)
New Zealand Touring Car series (Toyota)
1991: All Japan F3 championship (Ralt-Mugen) – 10th overall
All Japan Touring Car championship (Nissan Skyline GT-R) – 5th overall
1992: All Japan Touring Car championship (Nissan Skyline GT-R)
1993: All Japan Touring Car championship (Taisan Nissan Skyline GT-R) – 1 win
 Japan Endurance series (Honda Prelude) – 2nd Tsukuba 12 Hours
1994: All Japan GT championship (Porsche 911T) – 1 win
All Japan Touring Car championship (Honda Civic)
Suzuka 1000 km (Porsche 911T) – 1st in class, 2nd overall
Le Mans 24 Hours (Honda NSX) – 18th overall
1995: All Japan GT championship (Porsche911TRSR)
All Japan Touring Car championship (Honda Civic)
Suzuka 1000 km (Honda NSX) – 5th overall
Tokachi 12 Hours (Honda NSX) – 1st overall
Le Mans 24 Hours (Honda NSX) – 1st in class
1996: All Japan GT championship (Honda NSX) -13th overall
Entered NASCAR Thunder Special race at Suzuka
Le Mans 24 Hours (Honda NSX) – 3rd in class
1997: All Japan GT championship (Porsche 911/Dodge Viper)
Fuji InterTec race (Toyota Chaser)
Suzuka 1000 km (Lark McLaren F1 GTR) – 9th overall
Entered NASCAR Thunder Special race at Suzuka
Le Mans 24 Hours (Lark McLaren F1 GTR) – qualified 10th, retired from race
1998: All Japan Touring Car championship (Toyota Chaser) – 7th overall
All Japan GT championship (Toyota Supra) – 8th overall
Le Mans 24 Hours (Toyota GT-One) –9th overall
NASCAR at the California Speedway.
1999: Le Mans 24 Hours (Toyota GT-One) – 2nd overall
2000: Le Mans 24 Hours (Panoz LMP-1 Roadster-S) – 8th overall
2000–2003: Joined Team ARTA, racing an NSX once again in the All Japan GT championship.
2004–2005: Studied in Australia to complete inter-2 course.

Racing record

Complete Japanese Touring Car Championship (–1993) results

Complete Japanese Touring Car Championship (1994–) results

Complete JGTC/Super GT results
(key) (Races in bold indicate pole position) (Races in italics indicate fastest lap)

Complete 24 Hours of Le Mans results

References

External links

  
 
 
 Keiichi Tsuchiya  at Asian Athlete
 Keiichi Tsuchiya at Drift Japan
 2002/2003 TRD Tsuchiya AE86 Specs by AE86 Driving Club
 Tsuchiya AE86 Specs by TEC Arts
 Bridgestone Automobile Radio 
 Best Motoring International
 Keiichi Tsuchiya - From Teenage Tearaway To Drift King

1956 births
Living people
D1 Grand Prix
Drifting drivers
Japanese racing drivers
Japanese Touring Car Championship drivers
Japanese Formula 3 Championship drivers
NASCAR drivers
24 Hours of Le Mans drivers
Motorsport announcers
Japanese radio personalities
People from Nagano Prefecture
Toyota Gazoo Racing drivers
Team Kunimitsu drivers
Team Aguri drivers